The first season of The Fairly OddParents premiered on March 30, 2001 and ended on May 4, 2001. The season was produced by Frederator Studios and Nickelodeon Animation Studio.

Episodes

DVD releases

References

2001 American television seasons
The Fairly OddParents seasons